Hedypnois is a genus of flowering plants in the family Asteraceae.

 Species
 Hedypnois arenaria (Schousb.) DC. - Spain, Portugal, Morocco, Canary Islands
 Hedypnois arenicola Sennen & Mauricio - Morocco
 Hedypnois caspica Hornem.
 Hedypnois rhagadioloides (L.) F.W.Schmidt - Mediterranean Region from Canary Islands to Iran; introduced in Australia and North + South America

References

Asteraceae genera
Cichorieae